Matthias Willenbacher (born 14 July 1969 at Schneebergerhof, Gerbach) is a German entrepreneur and pioneer in the field of renewable energy. Willenbacher studied physics and founded the company juwi together with Fred Jung in 1996. He was a member of the Executive Board of juwi AG from its founding until March 31, 2015.

He is one of the protagonists shown in the film Die 4. Revolution – Energy Autonomy, and with his enterprise one of the main sponsors of the film.

Together with his partner Fred Jung he was awarded 'Greentech Manager des Jahres' in 2009 by the German magazine Capital.

Willenbacher and Jung established the 100 percent renewable foundation in 2008. With this charitable foundation, the founders want to make a contribution to environmental protection by promoting the use of renewable energies. 

In June 2013, his book Mein immoralisches Angebot an die Kanzlerin appeared, in which he offered Angela Merkel to give away his company shares to Germany's 500 citizen energy cooperatives if the German Chancellor implements a 100 percent, decentralized energy turnaround by 2020. In the book Willenbacher outlines a relatively detailed master plan on how Germany can be supplied with 100 % electricity from renewable sources. Key points are an increase in the full load hours of wind and solar energy plants and a mix of energy sources from 60 % wind power, 25 % solar energy, 5 % hydroelectric power and 10 % combined heat and power plants that are to be operated from sustainable sources. 

As co-editor, together with Claudia Kemfert, Hartmut Graßl, Michael Müller and Gero Lücking, Willenbacher regularly wrote a column in the online magazine klimaretter.info until 2014. Among other things, he pleaded for true costs for fossil fuels and pointed to their hidden environmental costs, which in his opinion are not reflected in the production price for electricity generation. He called for a fuel tax for conventional power plants as an alternative to the ineffective emissions trading system in order to accelerate the energy turnaround:

    "This would finally allow conventional power plants to contribute adequately to the costs of environmental remediation, the safe disposal of radioactive waste and the fight against emission-related health damage. We will then use technology to create a better world: a world in which the energy supply is exclusively clean, with a mix of wind and solar energy, hydroelectric power, bioenergy and geothermal energy. A world in which energy prices are low and remain stable in the long term, because wind and solar energy are free and infinitely available everywhere."

According to Willenbacher, he is the first European to own a Tesla Roadster.

References

External links
 Official website (German)

1969 births
Living people
People associated with renewable energy